Brent Rushlaw (born September 16, 1951) is an American bobsledder. He competed at the 1976, 1980, 1984 and the 1988 Winter Olympics.

References

1951 births
Living people
American male bobsledders
Olympic bobsledders of the United States
Bobsledders at the 1976 Winter Olympics
Bobsledders at the 1980 Winter Olympics
Bobsledders at the 1984 Winter Olympics
Bobsledders at the 1988 Winter Olympics
People from Saranac Lake, New York